Vito is a male given name. It may also refer to:

 Flemish Institute for Technological Research, research centre
 Mercedes-Benz Vito, van model
 Vehicle Integration Test Office, NASA entity formed to provide Space Shuttle Astronaut flight crew members insight as to the preparation, configuration and integration of the Space Transportation System prior to flight of the Space Shuttle
 Vito, a work for violin and piano by Pablo de Sarasate, part of the Spanish Dances, Op. 26
 Vito (Leblanc), brand name of musical instruments
 Vito (film), a 2011 film
 Vito (horse), a racehorse